The Kings Ferry is a coach operator based in Kent, England.

The Kings Ferry was established in 1968 by Peter O'Neill who remained as chairman until November 2007 when the Kings Ferry Travel Group was sold to National Express.

Commuter services

The Kings Ferry brand is used on commuter services from the Medway Towns to Victoria Coach Station, London.

The Travel Link brand is used for commuter services from the Isle of Sheppey and Sittingbourne. Travel Link was created from a merger of the previous Travel Rite lower cost brand, and The London Link, a company established by the Kings Ferry in 1999.

From November 2013 until April 2016, Kings Ferry operated services in Bristol and South Gloucestershire under contract to North Somerset Council.

In October 2015, Kings Ferry commenced operating a service from Maidstone to London, but commuter services from Kent & Medway were withdrawn on Christmas Eve 2021.

References

External links

 The Kings Ferry company website

Bus operators in Kent
Coach operators in England
Companies based in Kent
National Express companies
Transport companies established in 1968
Transport operators of England
1968 establishments in England